Lenin The Novel (published 1987) is a fictional diary of Vladimir Ilyich Ulyanov (better known as Lenin) written by the British journalist Alan Brien. It follows the life of Lenin from the death of his father in early 1886, to shortly before his own demise in 1924.

References

1987 British novels
Historical novels
Fictional diaries
Works about Vladimir Lenin
Secker & Warburg books